GPS BHADAM is a school that was established in 1954 and is managed by the Department of Education. It is located in the rural area of Shahkot, part of the district of Punjab, India. The school consists of Grades from 1 to 5.

References

Schools in Punjab, India
1954 establishments in East Punjab
Educational institutions established in 1954